Voglia di guardare , also known as Midnight Gigolo and Peep Show, is a 1986 Italian erotic film directed by Joe D'Amato.

Plot
Christina is the neglected wife of Diego, an overworked doctor. Feeling more and more alone, she decides to begin a relationship with the beautiful Andrea, who is also the owner of an elegant bordello.

Cast

 Jenny Tamburi as Christina
 Lilli Carati as Francesca
 Laura Gemser as Josephine
 Marino Masé as Diego
 Sebastiano Somma as Andrea
 Aldina Martano

See also
 List of Italian films of 1986

Notes

External links
 

Films directed by Joe D'Amato
1986 films
Italian erotic films
Films scored by Stefano Mainetti
1980s Italian films